University Laboratory School (ULS) is a charter school in Honolulu, Hawai‘i, United States, serving grades K-12. Prior to 2002, the school was known as the Education Laboratory School or University High School (when referring to grades 9 through 12) when it was a part of the College of Education at the University of Hawaiʻi at Mānoa.

It is not to be confused with Punahou School, which occupied some of the buildings at the university when they were displaced from their campus by the U.S. military during World War II.

History
The school was founded as the laboratory school to the Teacher's College at the University of Hawaiʻi and dates back to 1895 when a teacher training department was formed at Honolulu High School, located in Princess Ruth's former mansion. Between 1939 and 1941, an elementary school was built to give elementary and pre-school education students hands-on experience.  A permanent building for this purpose, Castle Memorial Hall, was constructed at this time.  It was a gift of Mary and Samuel Castle, who was one of the founders of Castle & Cooke.

Punahou School occupied Castle Memorial Hall and other buildings at the college during World War II (1942–1945).  However, the college continued to operate.

Buildings for the high school were constructed after the war with University High School Building 1 opening in 1943 and University High School Building 2 opening in 1948.  University High School Building 3 opened in 1957.  Finally, the Multipurpose Building is opened in 1963.  In the meantime the school graduated its first high school class in 1951.

In 1966, the school's focus changed to testing curriculum developed by the college for use in the Hawai'i Public School system under what is now called the Curriculum Research and Development Group (CRDG).  Since this time, admission to the school is based on creating a cross section of the state's socio-economic groups to meet the needs of the testing of the curriculum materials.  Over the years CRDG increased its marketing area of the materials they develop to across the United States and then internationally.

The university stopped funding the school in 1999 due to major budget cuts from the state of Hawai'i in the university's budget.  Alumni and friends raised enough money to cover the loss of revenue for two years.

In 2001, University Laboratory School became the charter school, Education Laboratory School.  The Hawai'i State Department of Education now contracts the CRDG to run the school and the university allows the use of the facilities on campus in exchange for use to test CRDG materials.

Notable alumni

 Steven S. Alm, retired judge, First Circuit (O`ahu) - Hawaii State Judiciary
 Egan Inoue, American Brazilian jiu-jitsu practitioner, mixed martial artist and racquetball player
 Enson Inoue, Japanese American mixed martial artist
 Quinn Kelsey, opera singer
 Randall Duk Kim, actor
 Tyson Nam, American professional mixed martial artist
 Joe Onosai, former strongman competitor and American football player
 Malia Ann Kawailanamalie Petersen, hula dancer
 Brook Power, Playboy Playmate of the Year 2017, Miss May 2016
 Norman Sakamoto, politician
 Konishiki Yasokichi, former sumo wrestler

Controversy

Over the years an unusually high proportion of the students are children of university faculty members or relatives of politicians and other island notables.  This has caused some to question the use of public moneys to fund this school including former Governor Benjamin Cayetano who essentially left the school with no funds.  Some view his actions as a retaliatory act since his children were not among the aforementioned individuals admitted.

Use of University of Hawaiʻi at Mānoa facilities
When the Educational Laboratory School became a separate entity from the University of Hawaiʻi at Mānoa in 2001, there was an understanding that the school would become self-sufficient within two years.  This meant being able to pay for its maintenance and not need any more university assistance.  In 2003 the chancellor of the University of Hawaiʻi at Mānoa Chancellor, Peter Englert, suggested that the university concentrate solely on research and cease managing the school.  He also suggested giving them a one-year contract to prepare to pay rent or move out.

Fire

On June 13, 2006, a fire erupted on campus in the University Elementary School building.   The fire spread rapidly, causing a devastating amount of damage to the building. Among the sections lost were the orchestra room (along with newly refurbished orchestra equipment), the choir room, the performing arts room, the gym, and the athletic office.
Arson is believed to be the cause of the fire.
School officials are waiting on test results to decide how to clean up the rubble. Findings of lead may hamper and increase the cost of clean-up.

References

A brief history of the University Lab School by Dr Don Sanborn (UH College of Education) and Sean O'Harrow (High School Class of 1986)

External links
 
 All-School 50th Golden Reunion in 2001 -- Please note:  This was not a fundraiser to save the school
 Alumni website

Public K-12 schools in Hawaii
University-affiliated schools in the United States
K-12 schools in Honolulu
Charter schools in Hawaii
Charter K-12 schools in the United States
Public schools in Honolulu
Public middle schools in Honolulu County, Hawaii
Public high schools in Honolulu